Edward Burton may refer to:

Edward Burton (footballer) (1869–?), English footballer
Edward Burton (Jesuit) (1585–1623), English Jesuit
Edward Burton (theologian) (1794–1836), English theologian, Regius Professor of Divinity at Oxford
Edward Burton (zoologist) (1790–1867), British Army surgeon and zoologist
Edward Burton (priest) (1737–1817), Anglican priest in Ireland
Edward Burton (MP), Member of Parliament for Pembroke, Wales
Ed Burton (1939–2012), American basketball player
SS Edward Burton, a 1945 cargo ship

See also
Edward Burton Gleeson (1803–1870), Australian politician
Edward Burton Hughes (1905–1987), American government official